Eupithecia implorata is a moth in the family Geometridae first described by George Duryea Hulst in 1896. It is found in the US states of California and Arizona.

The wingspan is about 23 mm. The forewings are variable in color. The ground color in typical specimens is a purplish gray, rather evenly suffused over the whole wing, and obscuring the brown shades of the median band. In other specimens, the ground color pales and the brown banding stands out quite prominently. Adults have been recorded on wing from January to July.

References

implorata
Moths of North America
Moths described in 1896